Castle Peak is a mountain in California's Sierra Nevada near I-80, Donner Pass, and the Nevada border. It is in the Tahoe National Forest not far off the Pacific Crest Trail, and adjacent to Castle Pass. It was originally named Mount Stanford by the Whitney Survey of 1860–74.

Castle Peak takes its name from its conical shape.

Climate
According to the Köppen climate classification system, Castle Peak is located in an alpine climate zone. Most weather fronts originate in the Pacific Ocean and travel east toward the Sierra Nevada mountains. As fronts approach, they are forced upward by the peaks (orographic lift), causing them to drop their moisture in the form of rain or snowfall onto the range.

Gallery

See also
 Sierra Nevada subalpine zone — habitat and forest surrounding peak.

References

External links
 
 
 

Mountains of the Sierra Nevada (United States)
Mountains of Nevada County, California

Tahoe National Forest
Mountains of Northern California
North American 2000 m summits